Axel Ringvall (1860–1927) was a Swedish stage actor and comedian. Towards the end of his career he appeared in several films.

Selected filmography
 Lady Marion's Summer Flirtation (1913)
 A Fortune Hunter (1921)
 Life in the Country (1924)
 The Devil and the Smalander (1927)

References

Bibliography
 Hans Pensel. Seastrom and Stiller in Hollywood: Two Swedish Directors in Silent American Films, 1923-1930. Vantage Press, 1969.

External links

1860 births
1927 deaths
Swedish male film actors
Swedish male stage actors
Male actors from Stockholm